Riaz ud-Din (24 February 1942 – 15 January 2001) was a Pakistani field hockey player. He competed at the 1968 Summer Olympics, winning the gold medal.

References

External links
 

1942 births
2001 deaths
Pakistani male field hockey players
Olympic field hockey players of Pakistan
Field hockey players at the 1968 Summer Olympics
Olympic gold medalists for Pakistan
Olympic medalists in field hockey
Medalists at the 1968 Summer Olympics
Sportspeople from Quetta
20th-century Pakistani people